Emmaville may refer to:

 Emmaville, Minnesota, United States
 Emmaville, New South Wales, Australia